Odagawa Dam is a rockfill dam located in Aomori Prefecture in Japan. The dam is used for irrigation. The catchment area of the dam is 16 km2. The dam impounds about 87  ha of land when full and can store 9700 thousand cubic meters of water. The construction of the dam was started on 1971 and completed in 1975.

References

Dams in Aomori Prefecture
1975 establishments in Japan